GC32 Racing Tour is a southern European-centered sailing boat circuit for GC32 one design foiling catamarans. It attracts both private owner-driven teams and those that are commercially-backed.

History 
The aim of the circuit is to provide the 'best foiling catamaran experience' for its participants. This includes visiting venues known to provide optimum wind conditions for foiling and race courses large enough to enable the boats to hit maximum speeds. The GC32 Racing Tour has several features in common with the 34th and 35th America's Cup in that it uses foiling catamarans and a similar race format which often includes reaching (rather than upwind) starts.

The circuit comprises five events. At each event and for the overall championship, prizes are awarded for the overall winner as well as the top 'owner-driver'. GC32 Racing Tour events also include the Anonimo Speed Challenge in which teams try to sail the fastest over a course that comprises two reaching legs with a gybe in between.

Events

2016 GC32 Racing Tour 

26-29 May: GC32 Riva Cup / Riva del Garda, Italy

7-10 July: GC32 Malcesine Cup

3-6 August: 35 Copa del Rey MAPFRE / Palma de Mallorca, Spain

22-25 September: La Reserva The Sotogrande

13-16 October: Marseille One Design

2017 GC32 Racing Tour 
11-14 May: GC32 Riva Cup / Riva del Garda, Italy

28 June - 1 July: GC32 Villasimius Cup / Villasimius, Sardinia, Italy

2-5 August: 36 Copa del Rey MAPFRE / Palma de Mallorca, Spain

13-16 September: GC32 Orezza Corsica Cup / Corsica, France

12-15 October: Marseille One Design / Marseille, France

2018 GC32 Racing Tour 
23-27 May: GC32 World Championship / Riva del Garda, Italy

27 June-1 July:  GC32 Lagos Cup / Lagos, Portugal

31 July – 4 August: 37 Copa del Rey MAPFRE/ Palma de Mallorca, Spain

12-16 September: GC32 Villasimius Cup / Villasimius, Sardinia, Italy

10-14 October: GC32 TPM Med Cup / Toulon, France

2019 GC32 Racing Tour 

22-26 May: Villasimius Cup / Villasimius, Sardinia, Italy

26-30 June: GC32 World Championship / Lagos, Portugal

31 July - 4 August: 38 Copa del Rey MAPFRE / Palma de Mallorca, Spain

11-15 September: GC32 Riva Cup / Riva del Garda, Italy

6-10 November: GC32 Oman Cup / Muscat, Oman

2020 GC32 Racing Tour 

25-29 March: GC32 Oman Cup / Muscat, Oman (Cancelled due to the COVID-19 pandemic)

27-31 May: GC32 Riva Cup / Riva del Garda, Italy

24-28 June: GC32 Lagos Cup / Lagos, Portugal

16-20 September: GC32 World Championship / Villasimius, Sardinia, Italy

21-25 October: GC32 Season Finale / Location TBA

Results

2017 Results

2019 Results